Seth Tyler Simmons (born June 14, 1988) is an American professional baseball pitcher. He played for the United States national baseball team at the 2015 WBSC Premier12.

Career

Amateur
Simmons is from Lewisville, North Carolina. He graduated from Cavalry Baptist Day School in Winston-Salem, North Carolina, and attended East Carolina University, where he pitched for the East Carolina Pirates for four years. He served as the Pirates' closer. As a senior, Simmons had a 2.78 earned run average (ERA) with 50 strikeouts in  innings pitched. In 2009, he played collegiate summer baseball with the Yarmouth–Dennis Red Sox of the Cape Cod Baseball League.

Arizona Diamondbacks
The Arizona Diamondbacks selected Simmons in the 40th round of the 2011 Major League Baseball draft. In 2013, Simmons pitched for Visalia, and had a 2.44 ERA in  innings. The Diamondbacks invited Simmons to spring training in 2014.

Simmons was named to the United States national baseball team for the 2015 WBSC Premier12.

San Diego Padres
Released by the Diamondbacks in 2016, he signed with the San Diego Padres, and was assigned to the San Antonio Missions of the Class AA Texas League. He became a free agent after the 2018 season.

High Point Rockers
In early 2019, Simmons signed with the High Point Rockers of the Atlantic League of Professional Baseball.

Long Island Ducks
On July 12, 2019, Simmons was traded to the Long Island Ducks of the Atlantic League of Professional Baseball. He became a free agent following the season.

References

External links

1988 births
Living people
Baseball pitchers
Baseball players from Winston-Salem, North Carolina
East Carolina Pirates baseball players
El Paso Chihuahuas players
High Point Rockers players
Long Island Ducks players
Missoula Osprey players
Mobile BayBears players
People from Lewisville, North Carolina
Reno Aces players
San Antonio Missions players
South Bend Silver Hawks players
United States national baseball team players
Visalia Rawhide players
Yarmouth–Dennis Red Sox players